JJW Hotels & Resorts Limited is an international private company of Mohamed Bin Issa Al Jaber with principal business interests in acquisition, development and operation of several hotels and resorts throughout Europe and the Middle East. The company has corporate offices in London, UK; Paris, France; the Algarve, Portugal; Vienna, Austria; and Cairo, Egypt.

JJW Hotels & Resorts has a portfolio of hotels such as Grand Hotel Wien in Vienna and the Hotel Balzac in Paris.  It also owns golf resorts in the Algarve, including the Penina Hotel and golf course, Dona Filipa Hotel, the San Lorenzo Golf Course and Pinheiros Altos private residential resort in Portugal with its 27-hole golf course.

JJW Hotels & Resorts in the Middle East operates the Amarante Pyramids, Amarante Garden Palms, Amarante Golf City, and the Nile cruise ships Osiris and Isis.

Since 2008 JJW also holds 60% of Kneissl, an Austrian manufacturer of skis and tennis rackets.

References

External links
 JJW Hotels & Resorts Company Site

Hotel and leisure companies of the United Kingdom